James Edward "Jay" Bond (April 11, 1885 – May 15, 1954) was an American football and baseball coach. He was the 16th head football coach at the University of Kansas, serving the 1918 season, which was shortened due to an outbreak of influenza on campus. Bond's 1918 Kansas Jayhawks football team compiled a record of 2–2. Bond was also the head baseball coach at Kansas from 1918 to 1919, tallying a mark of 5–9.

Head coaching record

Football

References

External links

1885 births
1954 deaths
Kansas Jayhawks baseball coaches
Kansas Jayhawks football coaches
People from McLouth, Kansas